David Melville was a Scottish professional footballer who played as a defender.

Career
Melville joined Bradford City from Partick Thistle in August 1907. He made 7 league appearances for the club. He left the club in August 1909 to join Stockport County.

Sources

References

Date of birth missing
Date of death missing
Scottish footballers
Partick Thistle F.C. players
Bradford City A.F.C. players
Stockport County F.C. players
English Football League players
Association football defenders